
Gmina Suchy Dąb is a rural gmina (administrative district) in Gdańsk County, Pomeranian Voivodeship, in northern Poland.

Villages
Gmina Suchy Dąb contains the villages and settlements of Grabina-Duchowne, Grabiny-Zameczek, Grabowe Pole, Grabowo, Koźliny, Krzywe Koło, Krzywe Koło-Kolonia, Osice, Ostrowite, Ptaszniki, Steblewo, Suchy Dąb and Wróblewo.

Neighbouring gminas
Gmina Suchy Dąb is bordered by the gminas of Cedry Wielkie, Lichnowy, Ostaszewo, Pruszcz Gdański, Pszczółki and Tczew.

References
Polish official population figures 2006

Suchy Dab
Gdańsk County